Jingping station is a station on the Taipei Metro's Circular line when it was opened on 31 January 2020. It is located in Zhonghe District, New Taipei, Taiwan, at the intersection of Jingping Road and Lane 123.

Station layout

Around the station
The Second Special Police Corps HQ (next to the station)
RT-Mart Zhonghe Store (next to the station)
Dayong Street Night Market (大勇街黃昏市場) (300m north of the station)
Daren Street Ziqiang Road Park (大仁街自強路公園) (550m northeast of the station)
Minzu Street Market (民族街市場) (750m north of the station)

References

2020 establishments in Taiwan
Circular line stations (Taipei Metro)
Railway stations opened in 2020
Zhonghe District